Acacia tumida, known colloquially as pindan wattle, spear wattle or wongai, is a species of Acacia native to northern and western Australia.

Description
It has hard grey glossy bark that is occasionally fissured with pruinose orange to yellow branchlets.

A. tumida grows quickly but has a short lifespan, usually less than 10 years.

Range
A. tumida has a range that extends from the Kimberley, Pilbara and north eastern Goldfields regions of Western Australia including much of the Great Sandy Desert. It also extends into the Victoria River district of the Northern Territory. It grows well in sandplain areas in red sandy or pindan soils over sandstone. They often form dense thickets with spinifex.

It is also cultivated in Yemen, Vietnam, Senegal and Niger.

Varieties
There are four recognised varieties of Acacia tumida:
Acacia tumida var. extensis
Acacia tumida var. kulparn
Acacia tumida var. pilbarensis
Acacia tumida var. tumida

Uses
Indigenous Australians used the trunk of young trees to fashion spears and boomerangs. The green seed pods were cooked over coals and the seeds then eaten. Fully ripened black seeds were ground into flour mixed with water and consumed as a paste or cooked and eaten as a damper. Other traditional uses include making string from the bark and using the gum exudate as a food source.

It is cultivated in Senegal and Niger, where it is used as good quality firewood and to create low windbreaks. It is also used with slower growing plants for binding soil.

See also
List of Acacia species

References

tumida
Fabales of Australia
Acacias of Western Australia
Flora of the Northern Territory
Taxa named by Ferdinand von Mueller
Plants described in 1864